The 1951–52 Copa México was the 36th edition of the Copa México; the 9th edition in the professional era.

The competition started on February 17, 1952, and concluded on April 6, 1952, with the final match that give to the team Atlante the trophy for the third time.

This edition was played only by 12 teams, however León did not enter because was the base of Mexico national team in the Panamerican Championship hosted in Chile from 16 March to 20 April; which was replaced by La Piedad (Second Division Champions). The competition was first played in a regional group stage and group winners advanced into a final group stage to determine an overall winner.

Group stage

Group West

Results

Group Center

Results

Group East

Results

Final stage

All the matches played in Estadio Olímpico Ciudad de los Deportes, Mexico City

Results

References
Mexico - Statistics of Copa México for the 1951–52 season. (RSSSF)

1951-52
1951–52 in Mexican football
1951–52 domestic association football cups